James J. Manderino (May 6, 1932 – December 26, 1989) was a Speaker of the Pennsylvania House of Representatives.

James J. Manderino served as the 133rd Speaker in 1989. He was a Democrat from Monessen, Westmoreland County.  He was a member of the House for 23 years from 1967 to 1989, including eight years as Majority Leader and was elected Speaker in 1989 after the retirement of Rep. Leroy Irvis.  Manderino died in December 1989 of a heart attack.

James J. Manderino had five children and nine grandchildren. His daughter, Kathy Manderino, is Acting Secretary of the Pennsylvania Department of Labor and Industry, having also served as a member of the Pennsylvania House of Representatives from Philadelphia.

Manderino was interred in Monessen, Pennsylvania.

References 

1932 births
1989 deaths
People from Monessen, Pennsylvania
Speakers of the Pennsylvania House of Representatives
Democratic Party members of the Pennsylvania House of Representatives
20th-century American politicians